Willie Porter may refer to:

 Willie Porter (basketball) (born 1942), basketball power forward 
 Willie Porter (English footballer) (1884–?), English footballer
 Willy Porter (born 1964), American singer-songwriter
 Willie Porter (Scottish footballer), Scottish footballer